David M. Bennett is a San Francisco Bay Area businessman who co-founded Mollie Stone’s Markets, a family-owned chain of grocery stores. In 1985 Bennett co-founded the first natural foods supermarket in the Bay Area. After his retirement from the grocery business, Bennett became a community volunteer and musician active in the Bay Area music scene.

Co-founding Mollie Stone’s Markets 
Mollie Stone’s Markets was co-founded in 1985 by partners David M. Bennett and Mike Stone. Bennett and Stone met while they were both attending California State University, Northridge and decided to go into business together. In the early years, grocer Richard Moresco served as a silent partner. Moresco had extensive experience in the grocery industry and mentored both Bennett and Stone. The company adopted the slogan, “Best of Both Worlds.” The first Mollie Stone’s Natural Farm Market was located on Woodside Road in Redwood City. This was the first natural foods supermarket in the Bay Area. Although customers were welcoming to this new business model, the company faced some backlash from other natural foods providers. Bennett reported to the publication, Retail Merchandiser, “A lot of health food companies wouldn’t sell to us,” Co-owner David Bennett reveals. “A few of the natural vitamin companies felt like we would destroy their brand’s reputation because we were moving them out of the local pill shop.” Natural food supermarket stores in Palo Alto and Sausalito quickly followed the initial Redwood City location. The company expanded significantly in 1996 when well known Bay Area supermarket chain Petrini’s went out of business. That year, Bennett and his co-founder facilitated the purchase of the Petrini stores in Greenbrae, Stonestown Galleria in San Francisco and the Bayhill Shopping Center in San Bruno Progressive Grocer reported that a Tower Market location in San Francisco was obtained in 2005  In 2011 the company expanded into the Castro region of San Francisco. Bennett celebrated this expansion saying, "The Castro Market is in one of the finest and most vibrant neighborhoods in California; we believe it will beautifully blend with our Mollie Stone's culture.” During the years Bennett co-owned the company, Mollie Stone’s Markets owned 9 stores, all throughout the San Francisco Bay Area. The company was celebrated in the press for many unique and family friendly initiatives such as eliminating tobacco sales and offering free childcare inside their San Mateo and San Bruno stores. Bennett spearheaded many of these innovative business strategies and has been widely recognized in the press for his entrepreneurial skills. While involved with Mollie Stone’s, Bennett prioritized customer service as he had a passion for catering to the needs of his customers.

Kosher food 
After a few years of existence, Mollie Stone’s became an industry leader in kosher food sales. Bennett responded to a growing customer base looking for a diverse set of kosher food offerings. In 2011 he was quoted as saying, “What we want to do is have a wide variety on a daily basis…we will start with kosher dairy products, lunchmeats, beef, and expand our groceries as we get feedback from customers.”

Awards 
In 2002 Bennett and his co-founder were awarded the Golden Spire Outstanding Business of the Year award from the Marin County Board of Supervisors.   In 2008, Bennett was honored with “Wall of Fame” recognition by the San Mateo Library Foundation for his numerous contributions to the community. The foundation recognized that Mollie Stone’s was the first market in the San Francisco Bay Area to discontinue the sale of tobacco products as well as the first to provide free childcare for children ages 2–12 inside the store, known as Mollieland. In 2012, The National Association for the Specialty Food Trade chose Mollie Stone’s Markets as their outstanding specialty food retailer of  the year. The company was one of only five food retailers to be chosen nationwide. That same year Unified Grocers awarded Mollie Stone’s the Ben Schwartz Retail Grocery Visionary award.  In accepting that award Bennett recognized the stellar workforce at Mollie Stone’s. He was quoted as saying, “We’re very fortunate that our employees have been...with us for many years...we have a wonderful core group of employees, which obviously is the success of Mollie Stone’s markets. We’ve been in business for 26 years, and we have many employees that have been with us over 20 of those years.”

Community involvement 
Bennett is a longtime Rotarian and frequently volunteers with the San Mateo Rotary. After his retirement, he became a frequent mentor to many small business owners in the food and beverage space. In 2019 he volunteered to mentor individuals involved in early stage start-ups such as plug and play. He frequently volunteers as a guest speaker for classes on entrepreneurial ship and what it takes to start a business in the city of San Francisco at local universities such as San Francisco State University and Golden Gate University. He also mentors students at the College of San Mateo to teach them about starting a small business.

Musicianship 
Bennett is a frequent supporter and participant in the San Francisco Bay Area music scene. He has played with widely regarded musicians such as Eric Maddox from the Timothy Murphy School.

Personal life
Bennett was born in Los Angeles, California. He spent his youth in Reseda, California and is a graduate of Chatsworth High School. Bennett honed his salesman skills while growing up in his family’s construction business.   He is married to his high school sweetheart and they have three children and numerous grandchildren.

References

Living people
Year of birth missing (living people)